Krishnan is a common name in South India. Krishnan refers to the Hindu deity Krishna. Krishnan is also combined with other names into a single name such as Ananthakrishnan, Balakrishnan, Gopalakrishnan, Jayakrishnan, Muralikrishnan, Ramakrishnan, Radhakrishnan, Unnikrishnan, and Venkatakrishnan.

Notable people with the name Krishnan 

 Kariamanickam Srinivasa Krishnan (1898–1961), Indian physicist who codiscovered Raman scattering with his mentor C. V. Raman
 M. S. Krishnan, Professor of Business Information Technology at the Ross School of Business, University of Michigan, Ann Arbor
 Madhaviah Krishnan (1912–1996), Indian naturalist, photographer and writer
 Maharajapuram Seetharaman Krishnan (geologist) (1898–1970), Indian geologist and geophysicist
 Nagercoil Sudalaimuthu Krishnan (1908–1957), Tamil film comedian
 Ramanathan Krishnan (born 1937), tennis player from Chennai
 Ramesh Krishnan (born 1961), tennis player from Chennai, son of Ramanathan Krishnan
 Ramya Krishnan (born 1967), South Indian film actor
 Trisha Krishnan, South Indian film actor
 Krishnan Guru-Murthy (born 1970), British journalist of Indian descent

See also
 Krishna (disambiguation)